Presidio de Lawis, known more commonly as the Kota or fort, was a Spanish fortification laid-down around 1628-1630 in the northernmost tip of Bantayan Island in Central Philippines by the Cebuano Spanish Army that became the nucleus of the modern-day municipalities of Madridejos, Bantayan, and Santa Fe in the Philippines. The edifice is the Philippines's oldest surviving Spanish military fort, older than Fort San Pedro (built in 1739), Fort Pilar (built in 1666), Fort San José in Cavite (partly abolished during the US regime and completely destroyed during World War II), and Fort Santiago (the current structure is only a replica, the original Spanish structure was destroyed during WWII).

History

It was long believed and accepted that the fort in Madridejos was only built around the 1790s. The fort's historical marker, posted outside the Fort's structure  to serve as guide for local and foreign tourist visiting the town, inscribed year 1790 as the date of fort's foundation.

Madridejos history scholar Brient Mangubat, who studied Bantayan Island history and the Lawis Old Fort foundation in Madridejos, argued that "the Kota was laid-down around 1628-1630 and not in 1790s. Constructed right after the moro raid in year 1628." He also claimed that the origin of the Island's name Bantayan have nothing to do with the Muslim raiders. 

According to Mangubat, the Island got its name in 1574 when the Island's northern side (LAWIS), was used as a "lookout post" after Da-an Bantayan by the Cebuano mainlander to monitor the Visyan Sea against the Chinese, as Manila was under attack by the forces led by Limahong. The Island's name was already used 25 years earlier, before the first Muslim raid took place on Bantayan Island in 1600.

References 

Spanish Colonial architecture in the Philippines
Buildings and structures in Cebu